Christophe Fauquet (born May 5, 1975) is a French bobsledder who competed from 1996 to 2006. His best Bobsleigh World Cup finish was sixth at Lake Placid in February 2005.

Fouquet finished 24th in the two-man event at the 2005 FIBT World Championships in Calgary. Competing in two Winter Olympics, his best finish was fifth in the four-man event at Salt Lake City in 2002.

References

External links 
 
 
 

1974 births
Living people
French male bobsledders
Olympic bobsledders of France
Bobsledders at the 2002 Winter Olympics
Bobsledders at the 2006 Winter Olympics